is a song by Japanese singer-songwriter Hikaru Utada, featuring guest vocals by Sheena Ringo. A corresponding music video was released on September 16, 2016, and the song was sent to radio stations as well, to promote the release of the album Fantôme.

Background and composition
The two singers had previously collaborated on Ringo's 2003 album Utaite Myōri: Sono Ichi, singing The Carpenters' classic "I Won't Last a Day Without You".

Written and composed by Utada, it is a J-pop song with influences from 1970's Italian pop music. "A Two Hour Vacation", as it translates, talks about the singers' need to escape every once in a while from daily life ("I love the sweet, everyday life / 
But the thrills are looking for me"). They admit that it is even best to escape just for a short time ("It's fine if it isn't enough / 
Fun is best a little at a time"), meet more regularly ("Greed will ruin you / Tell me, when is next time?") and how it is healthy to even "skip class" sometimes to "walk together in the park" instead.

Credits
Lyrics by Hikaru Utada; music by Hikaru Utada
Guest vocals by Sheena Ringo
Produced by Hikaru Utada
Arranged by Hikaru Utada

Release history

Charts

Weekly charts

Year-end charts

References

2016 singles
Hikaru Utada songs
Songs written by Hikaru Utada
2016 songs
Universal Music Japan singles